The 1681 English general election returned members to the last parliament of Charles II.  Dubbed the Oxford Parliament, the body elected sat for one week from 21 March 1681 until 28 March 1681. Party strengths are an approximation, with many MPs' allegiances being unknown.

References

External links
 The Commons 1660–1690
 Constituencies 1660–1690

17th-century elections in Europe
1681 in politics
1685
General election